Ali Enver Adakan (born 19 July 1977) is a retired Turkish dinghy sailor, who specialized in Finn class. He represented Turkey in two editions of the Olympic Games (2000 and 2004), and has been training for the Istanbul Sailing Club during his sporting career.

2000 Summer Olympics
Adakan made his official debut at the 2000 Summer Olympics in Sydney, where he delivered an effortless eighth-place effort in the Finn class with a remarkable grade of 66, finishing off the podium by 19 points.

2004 Summer Olympics
At the 2004 Summer Olympics in Athens, Adakan qualified for his second Turkish team in the men's Finn class by finishing eleventh and receiving a berth from the ISAF World Championships in Cadiz, Spain. After achieving a top ten finish in sailing from Sydney, Adakan was appointed by the National Olympic Committee of Turkey to carry the nation's flag in the opening ceremony. He mounted a second highest placement on the first leg of the series, but came up short for the podium with a sixteenth-place finish on 124 points.

Retirement
When he officially retired from sailing in 2005, Adakan was appointed as the vice president of sailing for the International Finn Class Association.

References

External links
 
 
 

1977 births
Living people
Olympic sailors of Turkey
Turkish male sailors (sport)
Sailors at the 2000 Summer Olympics – Finn
Sailors at the 2004 Summer Olympics – Finn
Sportspeople from Istanbul